Kimberley is the first self-titled and debut album by Australian singer-songwriter, Kimberley Chen, which released on 27 April 2012 included 11 tracks.

Track listing

Awards and nominations

References

Kimberley Chen albums
2012 debut albums